Aion is a Chinese electric vehicle marque of Guangzhou Automobile Corporation. It was introduced in 2018 as a sub-brand and in 2020 as a marque.

History
Aion was introduced as an electric vehicle sub-brand under GAC New Energy in 2018. The first model, the Aion S, was shown to the public in November at Auto Guangzhou. In November 2020, Aion was announced as a marque under GAC Group, replacing GAC New Energy.

In 2019 GAC announced 12 new models, which eventually included the LX, V, and Y.

In 2021, GAC announced that the latest Aion V would be equipped with a graphene battery that can charge from 0 to 80% in 8 minutes, adding 70 kWh of charge.

In 2021, Aion announced A480 charging station, 480 kW, 1000 V. 35.1kWh (30-80%) charge to the new Aion V 6C in less than 5 minutes and 0-80% charge in 8 minutes.

In September 2022, Aion revealed the Hyper SSR sports car along with a new brand logo.

Products

Current models

Future models
 Aion Hyper SSR
 Aion Hyper GT

Hycan

In May 2019, GAC and Nio announced they would form a joint venture electric vehicle brand called Hycan. This joint venture produced two vehicles, the Hycan 007 and Hycan Z03, both based on existing Aion vehicles (the Aion LX and Aion Y, respectively).

In early 2021, NIO's stake in Hycan was diluted to 4.5% and by August 2021, announced intentions to develop its own entry-level brand, putting the company's future involvement in Hycan into question.

Sales

See also
 Everus (GAC-Honda electric vehicles)
 Leahead (GAC-Toyota electric vehicles)
 Trumpchi (GAC passenger cars)

External links

References

GAC Group
GAC Group divisions and subsidiaries
 
Vehicle manufacturing companies established in 2018
Electric vehicle manufacturers of China